Szydłówek may refer to the following places:
Szydłówek, Łódź Voivodeship (central Poland)
Szydłówek, Mława County in Masovian Voivodeship (east-central Poland)
Szydłówek, Szydłowiec County in Masovian Voivodeship (east-central Poland)